Gornja Rženica is a village in the municipality of Plav, Montenegro.

Demographics
According to the 2011 census, its population was 248.

References

Populated places in Plav Municipality
Serb communities in Montenegro